Shimooka Chūji (下岡 忠治, October 26, 1870 - November 22, 1925) was a Japanese politician and bureaucrat. He served as Inspector-General of Korea from July 1924 and was a member of the House of Representatives from March 1915, serving in both offices until his death in November 1925. He was the second president of Keijō Imperial University, from July 1924 to November 1925.

Biography 
Shimooka was born on October 26, 1870, in Hirone, Kawabe, Settsu Province (present-day Inagawa, Hyōgo), the second son of village headman and sake brewer Shimooka Naokazu. The family moved to Tokyo where Shimooka graduated from Kōjimachi Elementary School. He graduated from Tokyo Imperial University in 1895, having majored in politics.

After graduation, he entered the Home Ministry. He then went on to serve as Counselor of the Legislative Bureau of the Cabinet and Governor of Akita Prefecture.

In 1911, he was appointed Vice-Minister of Agriculture and Commerce. He was then appointed Chief Secretary of the Privy Council of Japan in 1912, and Vice-Minister of Home Affairs in 1913.

In 1914, Shimooka was elected as a member to the House of Representatives and served four terms in office.

Shimooka was appointed Inspector-General of Korea in July 1924, and died in office on November 22, 1925, aged 55.

References

See also
Keijō Imperial University
Chūichi Ariyoshi
Paul K. Ryu

1870 births
1925 deaths